The music of Alaska (Iñupiaq: Alaaskam atuutiŋit) is a broad artistic field incorporating many cultures.

History and overview

Alaska's original music belongs to the Inupiaq, Aleut, Tlingit, and other Alaska Native communities.  Russian, English and Irish immigrants brought their own varieties of folk music.  Alaska was home to some of the United States' renowned performers, such as the singer Jewel (who had two No. 2 Hot 100 hits, including "You Were Meant for Me" and "Foolish Games"), and Hobo Jim, who was legislatively declared "Alaska's state balladeer".  Traditional Aleut flautist Mary Youngblood, singer-songwriter Libby Roderick, the traditional performing group Pamyua, and performing artist Karrie Pavish Anderson also identify as Alaskan. Alaska also has a prominent metal and rock scene. Metalcore band 36 Crazyfists originated in Alaska, as did indie rock bands Portugal. The Man and The Builders and the Butchers.

Music festivals and ensembles

Folk
The Alaska Folk Festival, held in early April in Juneau is among the state's most well-attended music festivals.  The Fairbanks Folk Fest annual "Summer and Winter Music Fests" and the Anchorage Folk Festival are also well known in their areas.  The Athabascan Old-Time Fiddling Festival, also held in Fairbanks (since 1983) is described "a testament to the far-reaching appeal of traditional music" in the Country Music Lover's Guide to the U.S.A.; the festival features Athabascan and Inuit fiddlers.

Classical
The most prominent symphony orchestra in Alaska is the Anchorage Symphony Orchestra. The Fairbanks Symphony Orchestra has served the Interior since 1958, and its traveling arm, the Arctic Chamber Orchestra, regularly tours rural Alaska, as well as occasional international trips. The Juneau Symphony is another notable institution which was founded in 1962. Youth orchestras include the Anchorage Youth Symphony.

Alaska also is home to a notable chamber music festival in the Sitka Summer Music Festival which attracts chamber musicians from around the globe, as well as the Fairbanks Summer Arts Festival. The Juneau Jazz & Classics Festival is a 10-day annual event, offering both formal and informal concerts in classical, jazz and blues music, including workshops for musicians of all ages, youth concerts, outreach activities, and community interaction with the featured artists.

Opera
The Anchorage Opera is currently the state's only professional opera company, however there are several volunteer and semi-professional organizations in the state as well. The Juneau Lyric Opera, a volunteer company, was founded in 1974 and presents concerts, choral workshops, and fully staged opera in Juneau and Southeast Alaska.

Country
Country music in Alaska is very popular, in part due to the influx of oilfield employment from the southern US. Popular local groups include the Ken Peltier Band.

Rock
The Anchorage community organizes several festival shows each summer, usually at Cuddy Family Park's small amphitheater.  The festivals typically feature performances by local punk, rock, and metal bands, although groups specializing in other genres such as rockabilly and noise have also made appearances.  The shows are loosely organized and community driven.  Non-musical attractions have included circus acts, auctions, barbecues, and bike sports.  Festivals are typically given a unique nickname, rather than sharing a common title (e.g. "Anchorage Festival of Unpopular Music" or "Bunk Rock Picnic"). Some notable local bands include Nervus Rex, I Like Robots, Danger Money, who, in 2017 and 2020 were voted best cover band in Alaska by readers of the Anchorage Press; and 2019 and 2020 by the Anchorage Daily News. Members of that band also perform as an acoustic-pop duo, Danger & Diva.

Acoustic Pop
Rebel Blues are a 3-piece acoustic blues band whose music is based around acoustic guitar. Danger & Diva perform contemporary pop/rock on acoustic guitar, including unusual arrangements of songs by the likes of Miley Cyrus, Britney Spears, Adele, Lady Gaga, and the like. They are a spin-off of the band Danger Money (Bill Little and Jennifer Brown).

More history

The first big flowering of rock (and specifically punk rock and alternative) was in the early 1980s with the arrival of Skate Death, and their contemporaries The Clyng-Onz and Psychedelic Skeletons. (source here)

In the 1990s the alternative band the Drunk Poets influenced the Alaskan music scene.

Anchorage is home to several over 21 and all ages venues including Chilkoot Charlie's, The Tap Root public house, and The Paddleboat Cafe.

Wasilla also has a thriving night life with several venues to choose from. The Rock Music & Sports Grill features many local bands and draws an interesting mix of performers for open mic shows. New to Wasilla is Club Hydro at The MatSu Resort, where local and out of state bands have been able to bring their talent to Alaska. Four Corners, MugShot, and Chepos also provide live entertainment.

Fairbanks has been the home of a wealth of bands of an incredible variety, especially considering its small population. Bands such as Paper Scissors, Work, Granddad, The Avery Wolves, Rebecca K. File, Joe Ransdell-Green, You're Fired, Slow and Painful, Say Yes, Annie Where the Sun Don't Shine, Eating For Two, Mr. McFeely, 37SCDW and Searching for the Real. Feeding Frenzy and Young Fangs were part of a Paste Magazine 50 States project and received shining reviews. The Scurvies are an Alaska legend and have gone to tour the Lower 48, accumulating a die-hard national following.

The Summer Meltdown festival is an all day, out doors festival in Anchorage featuring mostly local acts in Metal, Rock and occasionally Hip-Hop. The Alaskan band 36 Crazyfists have headlined the festival since its inception in 2005 along with other acts, such as Twelve Tribes and Subconscious, with the exception of 2008 when Poison the Well and MxPx headlined the festival, marking the first time 36 Crazyfists has not headlined.

Ignite Alaska was a music festival in Fairbanks, Alaska. It lasted two days featuring headliners such as Thousand Foot Krutch, RED, and Manafest as well as local bands from Anchorage and Fairbanks. It was a Christ-based festival with speaker, Blaise Foret, and a band leading worship songs. This event was held at the Carlson Center.

Missing in Alaska, a metalcore in San Antonio, Texas, has based their name on the state.

Clucking Blossom
There have been five Clucking Blossom Festivals held in Fairbanks in May 2005 – 2009. Though not related to the Angry Young and Poor Festival, some individuals who were involved in Angry Young and Poor became associated with the Clucking Blossom Festival because the scene is tightly knit. One of the ideas that fuels Clucking Blossom is to allow all the bands in Fairbanks to share a stage, combining acoustic music, bluegrass, punk, hip hop, metal and rock bands. This also gave people under 21 a chance to see bands that usually only perform in bars, as Fairbanks has an unfortunate few venues for live music. The event is open to everyone and there are events planned specifically for young children, as well as political presentations, a parade, (loosely) organized discussions and public art of all kinds.

Make-a-Scene!
Make-a-Scene! (or MaS!) was an Alaskan music venue located in Wasilla. Make-a-Scene! also held annual summer music festivals for several years. MaS! is also known in the Mat-Su Valley for its publication, Make-a-Scene! Magazine, which focuses on Alaskan musicians, poetry, art, politics and film.

Notes

References

External links
 Danger Money
 Eskimo Music
 Alaska Folk Festival
 Danger & Diva
 Athabascan Fiddlers Association

 Presentation on traditional dance among the Aluutiq

 
Alaska